Forest Hills Northern High School is one of the three high schools in the Forest Hills Public Schools in Grand Rapids, Michigan. The district's two other high schools include Forest Hills Central High School and Forest Hills Eastern High School.

Demographics
The demographic breakdown of the 1,165 students enrolled in 2018-19 was:
Male - 51.1%
Female - 48.9%
Native American/Alaskan - 0.1%
Asian - 10.3%
Black - 5.8%
Hispanic - 5.5%
Native Hawaiian/Pacific islanders - 0.1%
White - 73.6%
Multiracial - 4.6%
14.7% of the students were eligible for free or reduced-cost lunch.

Athletics 
In athletics, the school competes as a member of the Ottawa-Kent Conference. Forest Hills Northern offers the following varsity Michigan High School Athletic Association (MHSAA) sports:

 Baseball (boys) 
 Basketball (girls and boys) 
 Bowling (girls and boys) 
 Cross country (girls and boys) 
 Football (boys)
 Golf (girls and boys) 
 Gymnastics (girls) 
 Ice Hockey (boys) 
 Lacrosse (girls and boys) 
 Skiing (girls and boys) 
 Soccer (girls and boys) 
 Softball (girls) 
 Swimming and diving (girls and boys) 
 Tennis (girls and boys) 
 Track and field (girls and boys) 
 Volleyball (girls) 
 Wrestling (boys)

Notable alumni
Chris Afendoulis, former Republican Member of the Michigan House of Representatives
Jared Veldheer, National Football League (NFL) offensive tackle
Johnny Benson Jr., NASCAR racing driver
Mitch Lyons, National Football League (NFL) tight end
Steve Scheffler, National Basketball Association (NBA) player

In popular culture 
Forest Hills Northern High School is prominently featured in the Hallmark Hall of Fame television movie A Smile as Big as the Moon. The movie is based on the 2002 memoir of the same name, which was written by a special-education teacher and football coach at Forest Hills Northern, Mike Kersjes. Both the memoir and the movie recount Kersjes's experiences as he works to take his special-education class to Space Camp.

References

External links
 Forest Hills Northern High School

Public high schools in Michigan
Educational institutions established in 1972
Schools in Kent County, Michigan
1972 establishments in Michigan